John David Carlson, Jr. (born May 12, 1984) is a former American football tight end. He was selected by the Seattle Seahawks in the second round of the 2008 NFL Draft, and later played for the Minnesota Vikings and the Arizona Cardinals. He played college football at Notre Dame.

Early years
Carlson was born in St. Cloud, Minnesota, though his family moved to Litchfield right after his birth. As a football player at Litchfield High School, he was all-state in Minnesota his senior year.  He played in the 2003 U.S. Army All-American Bowl alongside fellow Notre Dame Fighting Irish players Brady Quinn, Ryan Harris, and Tom Zbikowski.  As a basketball player, Carlson was voted to the preseason McDonald's All-American list. He led the Litchfield Dragons to three state basketball titles during his freshman, junior and senior years. Carlson was also an all-state tennis player. His father, John Sr., is the former basketball and tennis coach for the Litchfield Dragons.

College career
Carlson played college football at Notre Dame, where he was a two-year starter at tight end. He was named captain in his junior and senior seasons, 2006 and 2007. He recorded 100 receptions, 1,093 receiving yards and 8 total touchdowns in his career. He lived in St. Edward's Hall, the oldest residence hall on campus, where his roommate was John Sullivan, current NFL free agent who last played for the Los Angeles Rams.

Professional career

Seattle Seahawks

Carlson was drafted by the Seahawks in the second round (38th overall) of the 2008 NFL Draft. On July 26, he signed a $4.52 million contract which included $2.5 million guaranteed.

He scored his first NFL touchdown on a pass from Charlie Frye in week 6 of the 2008 NFL season in a  loss to Green Bay.
In a season marred by injuries for the Seahawks, particularly at wide receiver, Carlson proved to be a reliable target throughout the season, and led the team in receptions (55) and receiving yards (627) for the 2008 season, a feat not accomplished in franchise history by a rookie since Hall of Fame WR Steve Largent.

Carlson had a notable performance in the Seahawks' 2010 playoffs, catching two touchdown passes in a win over the defending Super Bowl champion New Orleans Saints. In the following week's divisional matchup (a loss) against the Chicago Bears, he received a concussion after jumping and being hit in the air and landing on his helmet after receiving a pass near the sideline in snowy Soldier Field.

Minnesota Vikings
On March 14, 2012, Carlson signed a five-year, $25 million contract with the Minnesota Vikings. In 2013, his contract was restructured, with his base salary reduced from $2.9M to $1.5M, and his workout bonus reduced to $50,000. Paul Allen of KFAN Minnesota once said "the combination of John Carlson and Kyle Rudolph would be the best tight end combination besides Rob Gronkowski and Aaron Hernandez."

Arizona Cardinals
On March 7, 2014, Carlson signed a two-year, $4.65 million contract with the Arizona Cardinals. On May 5, 2015, Carlson announced his retirement from the NFL.

NFL career statistics

References

External links
 Minnesota Vikings profile
 

1984 births
Living people
People from Litchfield, Minnesota
Sportspeople from St. Cloud, Minnesota
Players of American football from Minnesota
American football tight ends
Notre Dame Fighting Irish football players
Seattle Seahawks players
Minnesota Vikings players
Arizona Cardinals players